Rafael Greifer, better known by his stage name Raf Riley, is a record producer and artist from North London. He was formerly a member of ExR alongside Etta Bond, and is signed to OddChild Music and has released on Diplo's Mad Decent label. ExR released two EPs: Emergency Room and Meds. He released his own EP titled Now That's What I Call Gangster Beats!! in January 2013. Riley is also known for his comedy production: alongside Reuben "Dangerman" Dangoor, Riley is one half of the Grand Spectacular. Their 2010 single "Being A Dickhead's Cool" became a viral video, receiving over thirteen million YouTube views. Riley and Dangerman are also part of the comedy rap trio Sabotage Party alongside Ray Knotts, in which he raps as well as produces. Dangerman also designs and directs all OddChild Music artwork and ExR videos.

Raf Riley has worked with many artists including Professor Green, Labrinth, Diplo, Naughty Boy, Dr. Luke and Mike Skinner. Riley has  had cuts with Elliphant, Skepta and has remixed for Sigma, Conor Maynard and Plan B.

Discography

EPs

Singles

As lead artist

As the Grand Spectacular

As Sabotage Party

Production credits

Remixes

Unreleased tracks

References 

Year of birth missing (living people)
Living people
English record producers
DJs from London
Dubstep musicians
Remixers
Electronic dance music DJs